Black Axis is the second album by Caspar Brötzmann Massaker, released in May 1989 through Marat Records.

Track listing

Personnel 
Musicians
Caspar Brötzmann – guitar, vocals, production, cover art
Eduardo Delgado-Lopez – bass guitar, vocals
Frank Neumeier – drums
Production and additional personnel
Peter Brötzmann – design
Thomas Moritz – mixing, recording

References

External links 
 

1989 albums
Caspar Brötzmann albums